Sweet Revenge is an album by David Johansen, released in 1984. It is the only Johansen album to be released on Passport Records. It was his first album without any participation by any other former members of the New York Dolls.

Around the time of Sweet Revenge, Johansen adopted his alter-ego, Buster Poindexter.  For the next 15 years, Buster Poindexter would remain at the forefront of Johansen's music career.

Track listing 
All tracks composed by David Johansen and Joe Delia; except where indicated:
 "Heard The News"
 "Big Trouble"
 "I Ain't Workin' Anymore"
 "King Of Babylon" (David Johansen, Joe Delia, Danny Toan)
 "Sweet Revenge"
 "Too Many Midnights"
 "In My Own Time"
 "The Stinkin' Rich" (David Johansen, Joe Delia, Brett Cartwright)
 "N.Y. Doll"

Personnel
David Johansen – lead vocals
Patti Scialfa – backing vocals on "Big Trouble"
David Nelson – guitar, Roland synthesizer, backing vocals
Neil Jason – bass on "N.Y. Doll"
Joe Delia – keyboards, sequential programming
Soozie Kirschner – backing vocals on "Big Trouble"
Brett Cartwright – bass, backing vocals
Dennis McDermott – drums, backing vocals
Steve Thornton – percussion
Jimmy Ripp – guitar
Artie Kaplan – saxophone on "N.Y. Doll"
Rocky Savino, Jr. – harmonica on "In My Own Time"
Peter Gordon – saxophone
Stephen Bray – drums
April Lang – backing vocals on "Big Trouble"
"Big" Jay McNeely – saxophone on "I Ain't Workin' Anymore"
Claudia Engelhart - "newscaster" on "Heard The News"
Technical
Davitt Sigerson and Michael Zilkha - production on "King of Babylon" and "The Stinkin' Rich"
Richard Gottehrer - production on "Sweet Revenge"
Larry Alexander, Fred Heller, Tom Lord-Alge - engineers

In popular culture
"N.Y. Doll" was used as the theme song for the 1984 film Fear City under the title "New York Doll."

References

David Johansen albums
1984 albums
Passport Records albums